Lonesome, On'ry and Mean is an album by American country music artist Waylon Jennings, released on RCA Victor in 1973. It was, after Good Hearted Woman and Ladies Love Outlaws, the third in a series of albums which were to establish Jennings as one of the most prominent representatives of the Outlaw country movement. Photographer Mick Rock shot the album's cover.

Background
By the spring of 1972, Jennings was burned out.  Suffering from hepatitis that he contracted while playing an Indian reservation in New Mexico, he took stock of where he was at in his life and career and seriously considered retiring.  Although Jennings had enjoyed a respectable run on the country charts, he felt hemmed in creatively and fumed when RCA told him where and how to record.  In the audio version of his autobiography Waylon, he reflected:

"Lyin' there, I started to thinkin' about what I'd won after ten years of bangin' around the honky tonks: my health was shot; I was close to a quarter of a million dollars in debt, and getting deeper in the hole whether I played shows or not; the I.R.S. was on my tail; and I was paying alimony to three wives.  If I went on the road I lost money, if I stayed home I lost more.  As for record sales, I never got ahead of...the packaging fees, and the overseas split, and the studio costs...You couldn't figure who owed what or why."

In the authorized video biography Renegade Outlaw Legend, Jennings recalled that he approached RCA and asked for an advance on royalties, which they agreed to initially, but later came back with a lesser offer of $5,000 on the condition that Jennings sign with the label for another five years.  Around this time, Jennings was visited by his long-time drummer Richie Albright, who was surprised at how depressed Jennings was and incensed at what he saw as a lack of respect from RCA.  It was Albright who arranged a meeting with Neil Reshen, a business manager at the rock magazine Creem who handled the careers of jazz legend Miles Davis and rock iconoclast  Frank Zappa. Reshen, who would also sign with Willie Nelson at Jennings' recommendation, was unimpressed by Nashville's tight inner circle and brought his no-nonsense approach to the negotiations with RCA bosses Jerry Bradley and Chet Atkins. In his memoir, Jennings wrote that the final meeting between the two parties in Chet Atkins' office hit a stalemate over $25,000 and nobody uttered a word for several minutes. Jennings, who needed to go to the bathroom, got up and left the office.  On his way back from the bathroom Reshen met him in the hall.  "You're a friggin' genius," Reshen exclaimed, "walking out like that!  That sewed it up.  Where'd you go?"  "I had to take a piss," Jennings replied.  "Well," said Reshen, "that was a $25,000 piss."  As author Joe Nick Patoski observes in his book Willie Nelson, Reshen "stayed in Bradley's face and in Chet Atkins's face. His real aim was to get Waylon off RCA and onto Columbia Records, where he had a relationship with label chief Clive Davis, but RCA let Waylon and his fourth wife, Jessi Colter, have their own custom label, WGJ."  According to the 2013 book Outlaw: Waylon, Willie, Kris, and the Renegades of Nashville, Jennings wound up with a deal that was unprecedented for a Nashville recording artist, including the freedom to produce his own records wherever he wanted, an advance that hovered around seventy-five thousand dollars, and an 8 percent royalty rate.  With the artistic freedom he had been pining for, Jennings began recording Lonesome, On'ry and Mean in late 1972.

Recording and composition
Although Lonesome, On'ry and Mean was a new start for Jennings, the singer chose to dust off a few older tracks, as Rich Kienzle recalls in the liner notes to the 2003 reissue:

"He included three songs on the album which were recorded before the new contract.  He recorded "Gone to Denver," co-written by his friend Johnny Cash (the two shared an apartment between marriages), in 1970.  Its producer was, ironically, the one with whom Waylon was least compatible: Danny Davis, a champion of overproduced, carefully worked out recordings.  "Denver" later became the flipside of Waylon's hit single "You Can Have Her."  With RCA's Ronny Light (who Waylon tolerated marginally better) producing, he recorded "Lay it Down" with studio musicians and one Waylor: pedal steel legend Ralph Mooney."

The third older cut was the Willie Nelson composition "Pretend I Never Happened," a Ronny Light-produced single released several months earlier, reaching #6 on the country singles chart.  The songwriters that Jennings turned to for his new LP, such as "progressive" country tunesmiths like Nelson, Kris Kristofferson and Mickey Newbury, reflected his new artistic freedom.  He also covered Danny O'Keefe's 1972 pop hit "Good Time Charlie's Got the Blues."  The album's revelation, however, was the title track, which unleashed a hard country sound that was unlike anything he had recorded before with RCA.  As Thom Jurek of AllMusic writes, "While Steve Young, the terminal country and folk music outsider, may have penned the title cut, it is Waylon's delivery as an anthem that bears in it all of the years of frustration at not being able to make the music he wanted to that is heard in the grain of its lyrics."  Critical to this tough new sound was the Waylors, Jennings' backing band, which had been practically barred from his recording sessions in the past.  In the audio version of his autobiography, Jennings recalled:

"We were in some big shot's office one time, and whenever [Waylors] Jerry or Ritchie would make a comment or ask a question, the guy behind the desk would look at me and answer it.  After a couple rounds of this I could see the hurt in the band's eyes...Well, they'd been with me through thick and thin, and I tried to let the powers that be know how I'd felt.  'We'd been hungry together,' I told them.  'My band is here for the long run.' 'Well, you don't bring your own cliques to Nashville,' they told me...I always wanted a live sound in the studio...I liked things that weren't perfect. It was okay for microphones to leak into each other like they do on a stage performance, and  I wanted to hear Richie's foot drum loud and clear.  I wanted to feel some excitement."

Jennings musical transformation was equaled by his appearance on the album cover and sleeve: shrouded in darkness, he had grown a beard and wore a leather vest, typifying a look that would become synonymous with the outlaw country movement over the next several years. He also made no apologies for his new, brasher sound; in a 1973 interview with Chet Flippo of Rolling Stone, the singer stated, "That's one of the big problems of country music. They don't want the country folks to know very much and they don't give 'em credit for knowin' very much. Country fans are as smart as anybody and it's an insult to 'em when a program director says, well, that song's too deep for our audience. Bullshit."

The 2003 reissue of the album features three bonus tracks, "Laid Back Country Picker", "The Last One To Leave Seattle" and "Big, Big Love". The first two were recorded during the Lonesome, On'ry and Mean sessions, while "Big, Big Love" was recorded during the Ladies Love Outlaws sessions. Though all three songs were issued in West Germany in 1985, none of them were issued in the US until this reissue.  The title track was referenced by Jennings' son, Shooter Jennings, in his 2006 album Electric Rodeo in the song "Little White Lines": "Got myself in a little mess, got busted down around Abilene/I was goin' way too fast boys, feelin' lonesome, on'ry and mean".

Reception

Lonesome On'ry and Mean peaked at #8 on the Billboard country albums chart.  In the LP's original liner notes, Chet Flippo of Rolling Stone wrote, "There's nothing faddish or contrived or artificial about him.  If he sings it, you can believe it.  Hank Williams had that rare gift and so does Waylon Jennings."  AllMusic calls it "the quintessential Waylon Jennings outlaw record."

Kelefa Sanneh said the album, "encouraged fans to think of Jennings not as an old Nashville pro but as a new kind of country antihero - as much a part of the counter-culture, in his own way, as the hippies".

Track listing
"Lonesome, On'ry and Mean" (Steve Young) – 3:41
"Freedom to Stay" (Will Hoover) – 3:13
"Lay It Down" (Gene Thomas) – 3:19
"Gone to Denver" (Johnny Cash, Red Lane) – 2:32
"Good Time Charlie's Got the Blues" (Danny O'Keefe) – 3:24
"You Can Have Her" (Bill Cook) – 2:44
"Pretend I Never Happened" (Willie Nelson) – 3:05
"San Francisco Mabel Joy" (Mickey Newbury) – 3:51
"Sandy Sends Her Best" (Billy Ray Reynolds) – 2:37
"Me and Bobby McGee" (Kris Kristofferson, Fred Foster) – 4:41

Bonus tracks
"Laid Back Country Picker" (Vince Matthews, Jim Casey) – 3:16
"The Last One to Leave Seattle" (Waylon Jennings, Steve Norman) – 3:27
"Big, Big Love" (Ray Carroll, Wynn Stewart) – 2:26

Personnel
Fred Carter, David Kirby, Dale Sellers, Billy Sanford - electric guitar
Billy Ray Reynolds, Chip Young, Jimmy Capps, John Buck Wilkin, Larry Whitmore, Randy Scruggs, Charlie McCoy - acoustic guitar
Ralph Mooney, Pete Drake - steel guitar
Bobby Dyson, Henry Strzelecki, Don Smith, Lee Miller, Roy Huskey Jr., Norbert Putnam - bass
Hargus Pig Robbins, David Briggs, Henry Strzelecki - piano
Billy Sanford - organ
Jerry Carrigan, Buddy Harman, Willie Ackerman, Larrie Londin, Richie Albright - drums
Don Brooks, Charlie McCoy - harmonica
Byron Bach, David Vanderkooi - cello
Marvin Chantry, Gary Vanosdale - viola
Brenton Banks, George Binkley, Lennie Haight, Sheldon Kurland - violin
Lea Jane Bernati, Ginger Holladay, Mary Holladay - vocals
Glen Spreen - string arrangements on "You Can Have Her"
Technical
Bill Vandervort, Les Ladd, Tom Pick - engineer
David Roys, Mike Shockley, Roy Shockley - technicians
Mick Rock - cover photography

References

Waylon Jennings albums
1973 albums
RCA Records albums
Albums with cover art by Mick Rock